Ornidia aemula is a species of Hoverfly in the family Syrphidae.

Distribution
Venezuela, Bolivia, Colombia, Brazil.

References

Diptera of South America
Insects described in 1888
Eristalinae
Taxa named by Samuel Wendell Williston